Malin Larsen Aune (born 4 March 1995) is a Norwegian handball player for CSM București and the Norwegian national team.

She also represented Norway in the 2013 Women's Junior European Handball Championship, placing 4th, and in the 2014 Women's Junior World Handball Championship, placing 9th.

She made her debut on the Norwegian national team in 2015.

Achievements
World Championship:
Winner: 2021
European Championship
Winner: 2016, 2020, 2022
World Youth Championship:
Bronze Medalist: 2012
Youth European Championship:
Bronze Medalist: 2011
EHF Champions League:
Winner: 2020/2021
Bronze Medalist: 2018/2019
EHF Cup:
Finalist: 2018
Romanian Cup: 
Winner: 2022
Romanian Supercup:
Winner: 2022 
Finalist: 2021
Norwegian League:
Winner: 2017/2018, 2018/2019, 2019/2020, 2020/2021
Norwegian Cup:
Winner: 2017, 2018, 2019, 2020

Individual awards
 All-Star Right Wing of Eliteserien: 2018/2019
 All-Star Right Wing of Møbelringen Cup: 2018

References

External links

1995 births
Living people
Norwegian female handball players
Norwegian expatriate sportspeople in Romania